Crime Slunk Scene is the eighteenth studio album by Buckethead and his fourth tour-only album. It was originally only sold on his 2006 tour but was later made available on Travis Dickerson's record label, TDRS music, until it eventually went out of print.

Background
The track "Soothsayer" (dedicated to Buckethead's late aunt) has become one of his more popular songs and is frequently played live. "Soothsayer" was voted third best guitar solo of the 2000s by the Ultimate Guitar community. Loudwire described it as "smoothest legato shreds of all-time". VH1 placed it 8th on the list of "20 Greatest Heavy Metal Instrumentals". The song was later included as downloadable content on Guitar Hero III: Legends Of Rock.
On April 27, 2017, Buckethead announced a vinyl format of this album through his Buckethead Pikes label, marking the first time since its inception that the label released a non-Pike album. This version excludes the final two tracks ("Mecha Gigan" and "Slunk Parade AKA Freaks in the Back") and is offered in three editions. The first is a regular vinyl, a second signed and numbered format, and a third limited edition package including the previous, plus a signed photo and poster, a guitar pick, and a sticker. The vinyl reissue was released on August 1.

Track listing

CD version

Vinyl version

Credits
 Dan Brewer Monti – programming and production
 Buckethead – bionic cattleprod
 Travis Dickerson – additional guitar recording
 Chris Jones – slunkwrangler
 P-Sticks – documentation

Release history

References

External links
 Download King James from Bucketheadland

2006 albums
Buckethead albums